Fagbule Olanike (also known as Nike Fagbule) is a Nigerian Entrepreneur and public relations practitioner, and the founder of Zebra Stripes Networks.

Early life and career 
Olanike was born in Lagos, Nigeria, and grew up in Satellite Town, Lagos. She started her career as a research expert for Deez Magazine. A friend introduced her to Ayeni Adekunle, the founder of Black House Media, and she was appointed as a public relations officer in 2007; she later became a senior manager. In 2012, she left Black House Media and started her own company, Zebra Stripes Networks, in 2013. In 2015, the company partnered with Dubai-based company Alive Now.

Awards and nominations 
Fagbule was nominated for the Creative Professional of the Year award at The Future Awards Africa in 2011.

References 

Nigerian women in business
Living people
Year of birth missing (living people)